Eupilaria is a genus of crane fly in the family Limoniidae.

Species
E. albicans (Edwards, 1933)
E. annulipes (Brunetti, 1918)
E. auranticolor (Alexander, 1932)
E. guttulifera Alexander, 1949
E. incana Alexander, 1949
E. inconsequens (Brunetti, 1918)
E. leucopeza Alexander, 1972
E. leucopoda (Alexander, 1931)
E. melanoptera Alexander, 1972
E. nigeriana Alexander, 1972
E. opaca (de Meijere, 1911)
E. phoenosoma (Alexander, 1931)
E. singhalica Alexander, 1958
E. suavis Alexander, 1949
E. taprobanica Alexander, 1958
E. thurmani Alexander, 1953
E. thysanotos Alexander, 1958
E. uma Alexander, 1962
E. varaha Alexander, 1956

References

Limoniidae
Nematocera genera